The Test Acts were a series of English penal laws that served as a religious test for public office and imposed various civil disabilities on Roman Catholics and nonconformists. The underlying principle was that only people taking communion in the established Church of England were eligible for public employment, and the severe penalties pronounced against recusants, whether Catholic or nonconformist, were affirmations of this principle. Similar laws were introduced in Scotland with respect to the Presbyterian Church of Scotland. In practice nonconformists were often exempted from some of these laws through the regular passage of Acts of Indemnity: in particular, the Indemnity Act 1727 relieved Nonconformists from the requirements in the Test Act 1673 and the Corporation Act 1661 that public office holders must have taken the sacrament of the Lord's Supper in an Anglican church. Except at Oxbridge, where nonconformists and Catholics could not matriculate (Oxford) or graduate (Cambridge) until 1871, they were seldom enforced after 1800 and the Tory government repealed them in 1828 with little controversy.

Corporation Act 1661

The Naturalisation and Restoration of Blood Act (7 Jac. I. c. 2) provided that all such as were naturalized or restored in blood should receive the sacrament of the Lord's Supper. It was not, however, until the reign of Charles II that actually receiving communion in the Church of England was made a precondition for holding public office. The earliest imposition of this test was by the Corporation Act 1661 requiring that, besides taking the Oath of Supremacy, all members of corporations were, within one year after election, to receive the sacrament of the Lord's Supper according to the rites of the Church of England.

Test Act 1673

The Corporation Act 1661 was followed by the Test Act 1673 (25 Cha. 2. c. 2) (the long title of which is "An act for preventing dangers which may happen from popish recusants"). This act enforced upon all persons filling any office, civil, military or religious, the obligation of taking the oaths of supremacy and allegiance and subscribing to a declaration against transubstantiation and also of receiving the sacrament within three months after admittance to office. The oath for the Test Act of 1673 was:
I, N, do declare that I do believe that there is not any transubstantiation in the sacrament of the Lord's Supper, or in the elements of the bread and wine, at or after the consecration thereof by any person whatsoever.

The act was passed in the parliamentary session that began on 4 February 1673 (Gregorian calendar). The act is, however, dated 1672 in some accounts due to the Julian calendar then in force in England.

1678 Act

Initially, the Act did not extend to peers, but in 1678 the Act was extended by a further Act (30 Car. II. st. 2) which required that all peers and members of the House of Commons should make a declaration against transubstantiation, invocation of saints, and the sacrificial nature of the Mass. The effect of this was to exclude Catholics from both houses, and in particular the "Five Popish Lords" from the House of Lords, a change motivated largely by the alleged Popish Plot. The Lords deeply resented this interference with their membership; they delayed passage of the Act as long as possible, and managed to greatly weaken it by including an exemption for the future James II, effective head of the Catholic nobility, at whom it was largely aimed.

Scotland
In Scotland, a religious test was imposed immediately after the Reformation, and by a 1567 law no one was to be appointed to a public office or to be a notary who did not profess Calvinism. The Scottish Test Act was passed in 1681 but rescinded in 1690. Later attempts to exclude Scotland from the English Test Acts were rejected by the Parliament of Scotland. In 1707, anyone bearing office in any university, college or school in Scotland was to profess and subscribe to the Confession of Faith. All persons were to be free of any oath or test contrary to or inconsistent with the Protestant religion and Presbyterian Church government. The reception of the Eucharist was never a part of the test in Scotland as it was in England and Ireland. The necessity for subscription to the Confession of Faith by persons holding a university office was removed in an act of 1853. The act provided that in place of subscription every person appointed to a university office was to subscribe a declaration according to the form in the act, promising not to teach any opinions opposed to the divine authority of Scripture or to the Confession of Faith, and to do nothing to the prejudice of the Church of Scotland or its doctrines and privileges. All tests were finally abolished by an act of 1889.

Repeals
The necessity of receiving the sacrament as a qualification for office was repealed in Ireland in 1780 and in 1828 in England and Wales. Provisions requiring the taking of oaths and declarations against transubstantiation were repealed by the Catholic Relief Act 1829. Sir Robert Peel took the lead for the government in the repeal and collaborated with Anglican Church leaders. The application of the 1828 and 1829 acts to Irish acts was uncertain and so the Test Abolition Act 1867 repeated the 1829 repeal more explicitly.

The 1661, 1672 and 1678 acts were repealed by the Promissory Oaths Act 1871, Statute Law Revision Act 1863, and the Parliamentary Oaths Act 1866 respectively. Religious tests for officers of the ancient universities were repealed by the Universities Tests Act 1871 for England, the University of Dublin Tests Act 1873, and the Universities (Scotland) Act 1889.

References

Further reading

External links
 Committees for the Repeal of the Test and Corporation Acts: the minutes of two committees for the repeal of the Act. First published by the London Record Society, available as part of British History Online.

Legal history of England
Acts of the Parliament of England concerning religion
1661 in law
1673 in law
1678 in law
17th century in England
Anti-Catholicism in England
Christianity and law in the 17th century